Bob Dickson (born November 11, 1947) is a Canadian retired professional ice hockey player. He was selected by the New York Rangers in the first round (sixth overall) of the 1967 NHL Amateur Draft, but never played in the National Hockey League.

References

1947 births
Canadian ice hockey left wingers
Fort Wayne Komets players
Ice hockey people from Ontario
Living people
National Hockey League first-round draft picks
New York Rangers draft picks
Oshawa Generals players
People from Leeds and Grenville United Counties
Salem Rebels (EHL) players